Serica vespertina is a species of scarab beetle in the family Scarabaeidae. It is found in North America.

Subspecies
These three subspecies belong to the species Serica vespertina:
 Serica vespertina accola Dawson, 1921
 Serica vespertina acola
 Serica vespertina vespertina (Gyllenhal, 1817)

References

Further reading

 

Melolonthinae
Articles created by Qbugbot
Beetles described in 1817